Conversations regarding the ethics of eating meat are focused on whether or not it is moral to eat non-human animals. Ultimately, this is a debate that has been ongoing for millennia, and it remains one of the most prominent topics in food ethics.

Individuals who promote meat consumption do so for a number of reasons, such as health, cultural traditions, religious beliefs, and scientific arguments that support the practice and generally argue that making a meat-free diet a social goal for all would be wrong because it fails to consider the individual nutritional needs of humans at various stages of life, fails to account for biological differences between the sexes, ignores the reality of human evolution, ignores various cultural considerations, or because it would limit the adaptability of the human species. People who do not promote meat consumption but eat meat anyway often do so because they feel that eliminating it from their diet would be difficult and fruitless as the animals are already dead, though this argument overlooks the principle that demand for a product affects its supply.

People who abstain from eating meat are generally known as "vegetarians". They avoid meat for various reasons such as taste preferences, religion, animal welfare, the environmental impact of meat production (environmental vegetarianism), health considerations, and antimicrobial resistance. Vegans also abstain from other animal products, such as dairy products and eggs, for similar reasons. 

"Ethical omnivores" are individuals who object to the practices underlying the production of meat, as opposed to the act of consuming meat itself. In this respect, many people who abstain from certain kinds of meat eating and animal products do not take issue with meat consumption in general, provided that the meat and animal products are produced in a specific manner. Ethical omnivores may object to rearing animals for meat in factory farms, killing animals in ways that cause pain, and feeding animals unnecessary antibiotics or hormones. To this end, they may avoid meats such as veal, foie gras, meat from animals that were not free range, animals that were fed antibiotics or hormones, etc.

In a 2014 survey of 406 US philosophy professors, approximately 60% of ethicists and 45% of non-ethicist philosophers said it was at least somewhat "morally bad" to eat meat from mammals. A 2020 survey of 1812 published English-language philosophers found that 48% said it was permissible to eat animals in ordinary circumstances, while 45% said it was not. The World Scientists' Warning to Humanity (2017), the most co-signed scientific journal article in history, called (among other things) for a transition to plant-based diets in order to combat climate change.

Overview of arguments for and against meat eating 

Conversations regarding the ethics of meat eating have been ongoing for thousands of years, possibly longer. Pythagoras, a Greek mathematician and philosopher who lived during the 6th century BC, made the case against eating animals on grounds of their having souls like humans. Taking an entirely different approach, Plato, an Athenian philosopher who lived during the 4th century BC, argued that meat is a luxury item that requires a lot of land to procure. As a result, he stated that the unmoderated consumption of meat would lead to conflict over land and, ultimately, an unsustainable society. Xenophon expressed similar concerns to Plato:

Rene Descartes, a 17th-century French philosopher, mathematician, and scientist, disagreed with the aforementioned stances. He argued that animals were not conscious. As a result, he asserted that there is nothing ethically wrong with consuming meat or causing animals physical pain. Immanuel Kant also argued that there is nothing ethically wrong with meat consumption. He claimed that it was personhood that distinguished humans from animals and that, since animals are not actual persons, there was nothing wrong with killing or consuming them.

Peter Singer, a Princeton University and University of Melbourne professor and pioneer of the animal liberation movement, argues that, because non-human animals feel, they should be treated according to utilitarian ethics. In his ethical philosophy of what it is to be a "person", Singer ultimately argues that livestock animals feel enough to deserve better treatment than they receive. Singer's work has since been widely built upon by philosophers who agree and who do not. His essential philosophies have been largely adopted by animal rights advocates as well as by ethical vegetarians and vegans.

Many other modern thinkers have questioned the morality not only of the double standard underlying speciesism but also the double standard underlying the fact that people support treatment of cows, pigs, and chickens in ways that they would never allow with pet dogs, cats, or birds.

Nick Zangwill, a British philosopher and honorary research professor at University College London and Lincoln University, disagrees with Singer's conclusions about the moral necessity of not eating meat. In Our Moral Duty to Eat Meat, which was published by Cambridge University Press, Zangwill argues that the existence of domesticated animals depends on the practice of eating them, and that meat eating has historically benefitted many millions of animals and given them good lives. Consequently, he claims that eating non-human animal meat is not merely permissible but also good for many millions of animals. However, Zangwill clarifies that this argument does not apply to factory farm animals, as they do not have good lives. Thus, when he speaks of meat eating being justified, he means only meat from animals that overall have a good life. Proponents of meat eating who subscribe to Zangwill's views argue that practices like well-managed free-range rearing and the consumption of hunted animals, particularly from species whose natural predators have been significantly eliminated, could satisfy the demand for mass-produced, ethically sourced meat.

Ethical vegetarians say that the reasons for not hurting or killing animals are similar to the reasons for not hurting or killing humans. They argue that killing an animal, like killing a human, can only be justified in extreme circumstances, such as when one's life is threatened. Consuming a living creature just for its taste, for convenience, or out of habit is not justifiable. Some ethicists have added that humans, unlike other animals, are morally conscious of their behavior and have a choice; this is why there are laws governing human behavior, and why it is subject to moral standards. Ethical vegetarian concerns have become more widespread in developed countries, particularly because of the spread of factory farming, more open and graphic documentation of what human meat-eating entails for the animal, and environmental consciousness. Reducing the worldwide massive food waste would also contribute to reduce meat waste and therefore save animals.

Some have described unequal treatment of humans and animals as a form of speciesism such as anthropocentrism or human-centeredness. Val Plumwood (1993, 1996) has argued that anthropocentrism plays a role in green theory that is analogous to androcentrism in feminist theory and ethnocentrism in anti-racist theory. Plumwood calls human-centredness "anthropocentrism" to emphasize this parallel. By analogy with racism and sexism, Melanie Joy has dubbed meat-eating "carnism". The animal rights movement seeks an end to the rigid moral and legal distinction drawn between human and non-human animals, an end to the status of animals as property, and an end to their use in the research, food, clothing, and entertainment industries.

Animal consciousness

Ethologist Jane Goodall stated in the 2009 book The Inner World of Farm Animals that "farm animals feel pleasure and sadness, excitement and resentment, depression, fear and pain. They are much more sensitive and intelligent than we ever imagined." In 2012, a group of well known neuroscientists stated in the "Cambridge Declaration on Consciousness in Non-Human Animals" that all mammals and birds (such as farm animals), and other animals, possess the neurological substrates that generate consciousness and are able to experience affective states. Eugene Linden, author of The Parrot's Lament, suggests that many examples of animal behavior and intelligence seem to indicate both emotion and a level of consciousness that we would normally ascribe only to our own species.

Philosopher Daniel Dennett counters:

Philosophers Peter Singer (Princeton), Jeff McMahan (Oxford) and others also counter that the issue is not one of consciousness, but of sentience.

Pain

A related argument revolves around non-human organisms' ability to feel pain. If animals could be shown to suffer, as humans do, then many of the arguments against human suffering could be extended to animals. One such reaction is transmarginal inhibition, a phenomenon observed in humans and some animals akin to mental breakdown.

As noted by John Webster (emeritus professor of animal husbandry at the University of Bristol):
Various programs operate around the world that promote the notion that animals raised for food can be treated humanely. Some spokespeople for the factory farming industry argue that the animals are better off in total confinement. For example, according to F J "Sonny" Faison, president of Carroll's Foods:

In response, animal welfare advocates ask for evidence that any factory-bred animal is better off caged than free. Farm Sanctuary argue that commodifying and slaughtering animals is incompatible with the definition of "humane". Animal ethicists such as Gary Francione have argued that reducing animal suffering is not enough; it needs to be made illegal and abolished.

Steven Best challenges this notion, and argues that factory farm conditions "resemble the mechanized production lines of concentration camps" where animals are "forced to produce maximal quantities of meat, milk, and eggs—an intense coercion that takes place through physical confinement but also now through chemical and genetic manipulation. As typical in Nazi compounds, this forced and intensive labor terminates in death." David Nibert says that sentient animals are treated as mere inanimate objects and "biomachines" in factory farms, or CAFOs, where they are often confined in darkness with no opportunity for engaging in natural activity, are mutilated to prevent pathological behaviors in overcrowded conditions, and genetically manipulated to the point where many can't even stand. David Benatar contends that of the 63 billion land animals killed annually to provide humans with meat products, the vast majority of them die painful and stressful deaths:

Writing in Current Affairs, Nathan J. Robinson describes the billions of non-human animals that suffer and die at the hands of human beings for consumption as a "holocaust" and, citing Jeremy Bentham's formulation "The question is not, Can they reason? nor, Can they talk? but, Can they suffer?" contends that it is "morally reprehensible" and "deeply wrong". Conversely, Jan Narveson argues that under certain theories of utilitarianism, positive utility can be increased by having more living organisms to experience it and thus by increasing the animal population so it can later be eaten, these theories could potentially justify raising animals for the purposes of consumption.

Critics of ethical vegetarianism say that there is no agreement on where to draw the line between organisms that can and cannot feel. Justin Leiber, a philosophy professor at Oxford University, writes that:

There are also some who argue that, although only suffering animals feel anguish, plants, like all organisms, have evolved mechanisms for survival. No living organism can be described as "wanting" to die for another organism's sustenance. In an article written for The New York Times, Carol Kaesuk Yoon argues that:

Supporters of ethical vegetarianism argue that support for plant rights obligates abstaining from meat, due to the use of plants to rear animals. For example, the feed conversion ratio for beef can require 4.5–7.5 kg of plant food to be used to produce 1 kg of beef. PETA states that "Whether it can be proved that plants experience pain or not, vegan foods are the compassionate choice because they require the deaths of fewer plants and animals."

Peter Singer has pointed out that the ethical argument for vegetarianism may not apply to all non-vegetarian food. For example, any arguments against causing pain to animals would not apply to animals that do not feel pain. It has also often been noted that, while it takes a lot more grain to feed some animals such as cows for human consumption than it takes to feed a human directly, not all animals consume land plants (or other animals that consume land plants). For example, oysters consume underwater plankton and algae. In 2010, Christopher Cox wrote:

Cox went on to suggest that oysters would be acceptable to eat, even by strict ethical criteria, if they did not feel: "while you could give them the benefit of the doubt, you could also say that unless some new evidence of a capacity for pain emerges, the doubt is so slight that there is no good reason for avoiding eating sustainably produced oysters." Cox has added that, although he believes in some of the ethical reasons for vegetarianism, he is not strictly a vegan or even a vegetarian because he consumes oysters.

Influences on views of animal consciousness
When people choose to do things about which they are ambivalent and which they would have difficulty justifying, they experience a state of cognitive dissonance, which can lead to rationalization, denial, or even self-deception. For example, a 2011 experiment found that, when the harm that their meat-eating causes animals is explicitly brought to people's attention, they tend to rate those animals as possessing fewer mental capacities compared to when the harm is not brought to their attention. This is especially evident when people expect to eat meat in the near future. Such denial makes it less uncomfortable for people to eat animals. The data suggest that people who consume meat go to great lengths to try to resolve these moral inconsistencies between their beliefs and behaviour by adjusting their beliefs about what animals are capable of feeling. This perception can lead to paradoxical conclusions about the ethics and comfort involved in preferring certain types of meat over others.  For example, venison or meat from a wild deer generally has a much higher nutritional quality and a much lower carbon footprint than meat from domestically-raised animals.  In addition, it can be virtually assured that the deer was never bred or raised in unnatural conditions, confined to a cage, fed an unnatural diet of grain, or injected with any artificial hormones.  However, since the necessary act of killing a deer to procure the venison is generally much more apparent to anyone who encounters this sort of meat, some people can be even more uncomfortable with eating this than meat from animals raised on factory farms.  Many ethical vegetarians and ethical meat-eaters argue that it is behaviour rather than supporting beliefs that should be adjusted.

Environmental argument

Some people choose to be vegetarian or vegan for environmental reasons.

According to a 2006 report by LEAD Livestock's Long Shadow, "the livestock sector emerges as one of the top two or three most significant contributors to the most serious environmental problems, at every scale from local to global." The livestock sector is probably the largest source of water pollution (due to animal wastes, fertilizers, and pesticides), contributing to eutrophication, human health problems, and the emergence of antibiotic resistance. It accounts also for over 8% of global human water use.

Livestock production is the biggest human use of land, and it accounts for around 25% of the global land surface, or two-thirds of all agricultural land. It is probably the leading player in biodiversity loss, as it causes deforestation, land degradation, pollution, climate change, and overfishing. A 2017 study by the World Wildlife Fund found that 60% of biodiversity loss can be attributed to the vast scale of feed crop cultivation needed to rear tens of billions of farm animals. Livestock is also responsible for at least 20% of the world's greenhouse gas emissions, which are the main cause of the current climate change. This is due to feed production, enteric fermentation from ruminants, manure storage and processing, and transportation of animal products. The greenhouse gas emissions from livestock production greatly exceeds the greenhouse gas emissions of any other human activity. Some authors argue that by far the best thing we can do to slow climate change is a global shift towards a vegetarian or vegan diet. A 2017 study published in the journal Carbon Balance and Management found animal agriculture's global methane emissions are 11% higher than previously estimated. In November 2017, 15,364 world scientists signed a warning to humanity calling for, among other things, "promoting dietary shifts towards mostly plant-based foods." A 2019 report in The Lancet recommended that global meat consumption be reduced by 50 percent to mitigate climate change.

Many developing countries, including China and India, are moving away from traditional plant-based diets to meat-intensive diets as the result of modernization and globalization, which has facilitated the spread of Western consumer cultures around the world. Around 166 to over 200 billion land and aquatic animals are consumed by the global population of over 7 billion every year, and meat consumption is projected to more than double by 2050 as the population grows to over 9 billion. A 2018 study published in Science states that meat consumption could rise by as much as 76% by 2050 as the result of human population growth and rising affluence, which will increase greenhouse gas emissions and further reduce biodiversity. David Attenborough warned in 2020 that "the planet can't support billions of meat-eaters."

Animals that feed on grain or rely on grazing require more water than grain crops. Producing  of meat requires up to 15,000 liters of water. According to the United States Department of Agriculture (USDA), growing crops for farm animals requires nearly half of the US water supply and 80% of its agricultural land. Animals raised for food in the US consume 90% of the soy crop, 80% of the corn crop, and 70% of its grain. However, where an extensive farming system (as opposed to a feedlot) is used, some water and nutrients are returned to the soil to provide a benefit to the pasture. This cycling and processing of water and nutrients is less prevalent in most plant production systems, so may bring the efficiency rate of animal production closer to the efficiency of plant based agricultural systems. In tracking food animal production from the feed through to the dinner table, the inefficiencies of meat, milk, and egg production range from a 4:1 energy input to protein output ratio up to 54:1. The result is that producing animal-based food is typically much less efficient than the harvesting of grains, vegetables, legumes, seeds, and fruits.

There are also environmentalist arguments in favor of the morality of eating meat. One such line of argument holds that sentience and individual welfare are less important to morality than the greater ecological good. Following environmentalist Aldo Leopold's principle that the sole criterion for morality is preserving the "integrity, stability and beauty of the biotic community", this position asserts that sustainable hunting and animal agriculture are environmentally healthy and therefore good. Jay Bost, an agroecologist and winner of The New York Times essay contest on the ethics of eating meat, supports meat consumption, arguing that "eating meat raised in specific circumstances is ethical; eating meat raised in other circumstances is unethical" in regard to environmental usage. He proposes that if "ethical is defined as living in the most ecologically benign way, then in fairly specific circumstances, of which each eater must educate himself, eating meat is ethical." The specific circumstances he mentions include using animals to cycle nutrients and convert sun to food.

Religious traditions of eating meat

Hinduism holds vegetarianism as an ideal for three reasons: the principle of nonviolence (ahimsa) applied to animals; the intention to offer only "pure" (vegetarian) or sattvic food to a deity and then to receive it back as prasad; and the conviction that an insentient diet is beneficial for a healthy body and mind and that non-vegetarian food is detrimental for the mind and for spiritual development. Buddhist vegetarianism has similar strictures against hurting animals. The actual practices of Hindus and Buddhists vary according to their community and according to regional traditions. Jains are especially rigorous about not harming sentient organisms.

Islamic Law and Judaism have dietary guidelines called Halal and Kashrut, respectively. In Judaism, meat that may be consumed according to halakha (Jewish law) is termed kosher; meat that is not compliant with Jewish law is called treif. Causing unnecessary pain to animals is prohibited by the principle of tza'ar ba'alei chayim. While it is neither required nor prohibited for Jews to eat meat, a number of medieval scholars of Judaism, such as Joseph Albo and Isaac Arama, regard vegetarianism as a moral ideal. Similarly, Islamic dietary laws permit the consumption of certain animals at the condition that their meat is not obtained through prohibited methods of slaughtering (ex: strangling, beaten to death, etc.), along with adherence to other restrictions. Meat obtained through prohibited methods of slaughtering is considered haram.

In Christianity as practised by members of Eastern Orthodox Church, Roman Catholic Church, Greek Catholic Church, and others, it is prohibited to eat meat in times of fasting. Rules of fasting also vary. There are also Christian monastic orders that practice vegetarianism.

Shinto has a concept of kegare, which means a state of pollution and defilement, and traditionally eating animals is thought to be one of them. Eating animals having more legs is thought to be worse. (Eating mammals is worse than eating chickens or fish.) This concept leads to discrimination against slaughtermen and people who work with leather, who are called burakumin. Shinran, the founder of the Buddhist sect Jōdo Shinshū, taught that lower class who had to kill beings could enter nirvana even though killing animals was thought to be immoral.

Personhood
It has been argued by a number of modern philosophers that a moral community requires all participants to be able to make moral decisions, but animals are incapable of making moral choices (e.g., a tiger would not refrain from eating a human because it was morally wrong; it would decide whether to attack based on its survival needs, as dictated by hunger). Thus, some opponents of ethical vegetarianism argue that the analogy between killing animals and killing people is misleading. For example, Hsiao (2015) compares the moral severity of harming animals to that of picking a flower or introducing malware into a computer. Others have argued that humans are capable of culture, innovation, and the sublimation of instinct in order to act in an ethical manner while animals are not, and so are unequal to humans on a moral level. This does not excuse cruelty, but it implies animals are not morally equivalent to humans and do not possess the rights a human has. The precise definition of a moral community is not simple, but Hsiao defines membership by the ability to know one's own good and that of other members, and to be able to grasp this in the abstract. He claims that non-human animals do not meet this standard.

Benjamin Franklin describes his conversion to vegetarianism in chapter one of his autobiography, but then he describes why he (periodically) ceased vegetarianism in his later life:

Zoonotic diseases and antibiotic resistance 

Opponents of eating meat argue that meat production foments zoonotic diseases, leading to increased pandemics, a claim backed up by a 2020 United Nations report. A 2017 paper stated that "An estimated 60% of known infectious diseases and up to 75% of new or emerging infectious diseases are zoonotic in origin" and that "It is estimated that zoonoses are responsible for 2.5 billion cases of human illness and 2.7 million human deaths worldwide each year". Meat production often involves the usage of antibiotics on livestock, fueling antibiotic resistance. Antibiotic resistance has been argued to be as big of a threat as climate change.

Critics of this line of reasoning state that while widespread adoption of vegan diets would reduce the fomenting of zoonotic diseases, antibiotic resistance, and pandemics, vegan food production still often involves antibiotics and does not eliminate these problems altogether.

Animals killed in crop harvesting
Steven Davis, a professor of animal science at Oregon State University, argues that the least harm principle does not require giving up all meat. Davis states that a diet containing beef from grass-fed ruminants such as cattle would kill fewer animals than a vegetarian diet, particularly when one takes into account animals killed by agriculture.

This conclusion has been criticized by Jason Gaverick Matheny (founder of in vitro meat organization New Harvest) because it calculates the number of animals killed per acre (instead of per consumer). Matheny says that, when the numbers are adjusted, Davis' argument shows veganism as perpetrating the least harm. Davis' argument has also been criticized by Andy Lamey for being based on only two studies that may not represent commercial agricultural practices. When differentiating between animals killed by farm machinery and those killed by other animals, he says that the studies again show veganism to do the "least harm".

Christopher Bobier argues that arguments against the consumption of factory-farmed meat can also apply to vegetables produced under factory conditions due to animals killed in the production process (arguing that alternative sources of vegetables mean factory-produced vegetables are not necessary) and thus does not represent a prima-facie argument for vegetarianism.

Non-meat products

One of the main differences between a vegan and a typical vegetarian diet is the avoidance of both eggs and dairy products such as milk, cheese, butter, and yogurt. Ethical vegans do not consume dairy or eggs because of the exploitation and slaughter of animals in the dairy and egg industries and because of the environmental effect of dairy production.

To produce milk from dairy cattle, most calves are separated from their mothers soon after birth and fed milk replacement in order to retain the cows' milk for human consumption. Animal welfare advocates point out that this breaks the natural bond between the mother and her calf. Unwanted male calves are either slaughtered at birth or sent for veal production. To prolong lactation, dairy cows are almost permanently kept pregnant through artificial insemination. Although cows' natural life expectancy is about twenty years, after about five years the cows' milk production has dropped; they are then considered "spent" and are sent to slaughter for meat and leather.

Battery cages are the predominant form of housing for laying hens worldwide; these cages reduce aggression and cannibalism among hens, but are barren, restrict movement, and increase rates of osteoporosis. In these systems and in free-range egg production, unwanted male chicks are culled and killed at birth during the process of securing a further generation of egg-laying hens.

See also 

 Animal–industrial complex
 Cultured meat
 Devour the Earth
 Economic vegetarianism
 Ethical omnivorism
 Ethics of uncertain sentience
 Hard problem of consciousness
 Moral agency
 Non-aggression principle
 Psychology of eating meat
 Problem of other minds
 Replaceability argument
 Sustainable diet

References

External links
 A Dissertation on the Voluntary Eating of Blood: An 18th-century justification of the eating of meat. Rare WZ 260 D626 1745. Digitized copy hosted by the UCLA Digital Library.
 The moral basis of vegetarianism (1959) e-book by Mahatma Gandhi
 The Ethics of Diet: A Catena of Authorities Deprecatory of the Practice of Flesh-Eating by Howard Williams M.A. (1837–1931)

Animal rights
Cruelty to animals
Ethical consumerism
Issues in animal ethics